Aman Nath (born 1951) is an Indian writer, hotelier, and architectural restorer. He is the co-founder and co-chairman of the Neemrana Hotels chain, along with Francis Wacziarg. Both are today credited for pioneering the heritage hotels movement in India. They started in 1991. Since then, they have acquired over 25 heritage properties and converted them into heritage hotels after restoration. Nath has published several illustrated books on Rajasthan and Indian arts.

In June 2016, Nath and five others, all members of the LGBT community themselves, filed a writ petition in the Supreme Court of India challenging Section 377 of the Indian Penal Code. This resulted in the 2018 landmark judgment in Navtej Singh Johar and others v. Union of India in which the Supreme Court unanimously declared the law unconstitutional "in so far as it criminalises consensual sexual conduct between adults of the same sex".

Early life and education
Born and brought up in New Delhi, Aman Nath's family migrated from Lahore, Pakistan during the partition of India to settle in Delhi. He completed his education with a post-graduate degree in medieval Indian history from Delhi University.  He also has an adopted daughter named Aadya Nath.

Career

Nath started his career as a copywriter and graphic designer in advertising. He was one of the founding members of INTACH, a heritage and conservation organisation, established in 1984. He became the arts editor for the magazine India Today, and later remained curator of "Art Today"—an art gallery of the India Today group, situated at Connaught Place, New Delhi—for seven years. Meanwhile, he started publishing books on history and heritage, including "Jaipur: the Last Destination", "Arts and Crafts of Rajasthan", and "Dome Over India: Rashtrapati Bhavan.".

He first came across the ruined 15th-century Neemarana Fort, about 120 km from Delhi, in 1981 while researching for a book on Shekhawati painting and frescoes with Francis Wacziarg, former French diplomat and resident of India since 1969. After restoring two havelis in Rajasthan, they had developed enough expertise to take on the fort. Thus in 1986, they acquired the fort and, after restoration, a 12-room heritage hotel was opened in 1991. Over the years, they have acquired many heritage forts and palaces and converted them into successful heritage hotels, including Neemrana Fort Palace, Hill Fort Kesroli, Pataudi Palace, and Baradari Palace in Patiala.

In 2011, Neemrana Hotels had 25 properties in 17 locations.

Nath lives in the Nizamuddin East area of New Delhi.

Works
 Rajasthan: the painted walls of Shekhavati, with Francis Wacziarg. Vikas Publications, 1982. .
 Goa. Vikas Publishing House, 1984. .
 Arts and crafts of Rajasthan, with Francis Wacziarg. Mapin Publishing, 1997. .
 Horizons: the Tata-India century, 1904–2004, with Jay Vithalani, Tulsi Vatsal, Amit Pasricha (photographs). India Book House, 2004. .
 Larger Than Life: The Popular Arts of India. India Book House, 2004. .
 Palaces of Rajasthan, with George Michell, Antonio Martinelli (photographs). Frances Lincoln, 2005.
 Brahma's Pushkar: ancient Indian pilgrimage. Rajan Kapoor (photographs). India Book House, 2005. .
 Jaipur: The Last Destination, with Samar Singh Jodha (photographs), India Book House, 2006. .
 Dome Over India. India Book House, 2006. .
 Jodhpur's Umaid Bhawan: The Maharaja of palaces : a book, with Fred R. Holmes, Anna Newton Holmes, Amit Paschira (photographer). India Book House, 2008. .
 The Monumental India book. Amit Pasricha (photographer). Constable, 2008. .

References 

 "An interview with Mr. Aman Nath, architect, interior designer and art restorer". The Hindu. 20 December 2000.
 Aman Nath articles at Outlook

External links
 Neemrana Hotels
  at TEDx

Indian hoteliers
1951 births
Living people
Writers from Delhi
People from Lahore
Delhi University alumni
Conservator-restorers
Indian architecture writers